{{DISPLAYTITLE:C30H50}}
The molecular formula C30H50 (molar mass: 410.72 g/mol, exact mass: 410.3913 u) may refer to:

 Squalene
 Hopene
 diploptene (Hop-22(29)-ene)

Molecular formulas